International Certification for Digital Literacy (ICDL), formerly known as European Computer Driving Licence (ECDL), is a computer literacy certification program provided by ECDL Foundation, a not-for-profit organisation.
The ICDL / ECDL certification is a globally recognised information and communication technology (ICT) and digital literacy qualification.

In 1995, the ECDL certification programme was developed through a task force of the Council of European Professional Informatics Societies (CEPIS) and was recommended by the European Commission High Level Group, ESDIS, to be a Europe-wide certification scheme. The task force compared several national certification schemes and chose the CDL from Finland as the basis for piloting and later adoption into the ECDL.

Contents 
Though the ICDL does not refer to Microsoft or its Office software suite by name in the official course syllabus, training occurs almost exclusively with Microsoft's products as they are ubiquitous in the business world.

For the Base certificate, there are no pre-requisites regarding computer use.

Levels 
The ICDL Base certificate comprises all four of these modules:
 basic operation of a computer and Microsoft Windows
 basic operation of the internet
 basic use of Microsoft Word
 basic use of Microsoft Excel

The ICDL Standard certificate involves the aforementioned Base module, and three of the following modules:
 databases (Microsoft Access)
 creating and using presentations (Microsoft PowerPoint)
 collaborating online (mostly Microsoft Teams)
 IT security
 editing images

The ICDL Advanced certificate comprises one of the following modules; the ICDL Expert certificate three of the following modules:
 advanced use of Microsoft Word
 advanced use of Microsoft Excel
 advanced use of Microsoft Access
 advanced use of Microsoft PowerPoint

Testing 
In order to take the tests, a candidate buys an ECDL Skills Card, which usually is issued electronically and serves as a login to the testing platform. To prepare for a module test, the candidate may use ECDL diagnostic tests. Testing is done using software which simulates the Windows/Microsoft Office environment. The candidate's mouse movements and keystrokes are monitored and the result of the test is reported immediately after the test is completed.

Value 
The ICDL certificates are seen as valuable in business/government administration - as they save the time to evaluate an applicant's computer skills. In professions like publishing, graphic and web design, science or information technology, a completed ICDL course is not a desired quality however as the work requires specialist skills and experience with other software.

References

External links

ECDL Foundation

ICDL Asia

ICDL Arabia

ICDL Africa

ICDL USA

Information technology qualifications
Digital divide
Educational qualifications in the United Kingdom